Leeman may refer to:

People
Gary Leeman (born 1964), ice hockey player
George Leeman (1809–1882), MP for York, England and chairman of the North Eastern Railway
Kimberly Leemans, model
Paul Leeman (born 1978), Northern Irish footballer
Leeman Bennett (born 1938), American football coach

Places
Leeman, California, United States
Leeman, Wisconsin, United States
Leeman, Western Australia

Sports
Lee Man FC, a Hong Kong professional football club

See also
Leaman (disambiguation)
Leemans
Lehman (disambiguation)
Lehmann (disambiguation)
Leman (disambiguation)